Rakkhi Bahini'r Shotto-Mittha is a book written by Lt. Col. (retired) Anwar Ul Alam which explores the various activities of the Jatiya Rakkhi Bahini during Sheikh Mujibur Rahman's rule.

References 
 
 

Political books
History books about Bangladesh